Mica Brka-Krajević distinguished himself in several battles in the Serbian Revolution, from 1804 to 1813, particularly at Mačva. National Serbian ballads name Krajević as one of the many heroes of the revolutionary wars. He died fighting the Turks alongside Hajduk Veljko.

Mica Brka-Krajević of Mavrovo, son of Miloš Krajević, came from Old Serbia and joined forces with Karađorđe. An experienced soldier, Krajević was a lieutenant of the Serbian volunteers in the Austro-Turkish War. Serbs from all the Serbian territories took part in the struggle against the Turkish invaders. The Serbs from Old Serbia (now North Macedonia) bore their share with the rest of their kinfolk in Vojvodina, Bosnia and Herzegovina, Dalmatia, Croatia, and Montenegro.

Legacy
His deeds and actions in the Serbian revolutionary wars are memorialized by guslars in a collection of Serbian national ballads and songs which is now part of Serbian literature.

Sources
 Milan Đ. Milićević, Pomenik znamenitih ljudi u srpskog narodu novijega doba, Vol 1 (Belgrade, 1888)
 Milan Đ. Milićević, Kneževina Srbija (Belgrade, 1878)

See also
 List of Serbian Revolutionaries

References 

Serbian Revolution
Austro-Turkish Wars
Characters in Serbian epic poetry
First Serbian Uprising
Serbs from the Ottoman Empire